The MacRobertson Bridge is a road bridge that carries Grange Road from Toorak on the south bank into Burnley, over the Yarra River and the Monash Freeway in Melbourne, Victoria, Australia.

The first river crossing at the site was Twickenham Ferry, which conveyed passengers and was founded by waterman Jesse Barrow in 1880. it was named for the Twickenham Ferry in London. The ferry survived until 1934, when it was replaced by the MacRobertson Bridge, financed by Sir Macpherson Robertson. When built the bridge was one of two bridges in the world to be the first to use welded steel trusses.

As built the bridge only spanned the Yarra, but in 1967 the South Eastern Arterial was built, running under the northernmost span.

References

External links
 Photo: Twickenham ferry
 Photo: Model of the bridge
 Photo: Construction of the bridge

Bridges over the Yarra River
1934 establishments in Australia
Bridges completed in 1934
Bridges in Melbourne
Transport in the City of Yarra
Buildings and structures in the City of Yarra
Transport in the City of Stonnington
Buildings and structures in the City of Stonnington